or Bye Bye Belgium, also called "The Flemish Secession Hoax," was a hoax perpetrated by the French-language Belgian public TV station RTBF on Wednesday, December 13, 2006.  Regular programming on the channel La Une was interrupted for a news bulletin claiming that the Flemish parliament had issued a unilateral declaration of independence from the Kingdom of Belgium, mimicking the Belgian secession from the Netherlands some 175 years earlier.

Interviews with prominent Belgian politicians (some of whom had been informed about the hoax) as well as staged footage of the evacuation of the royal family as well as cheering crowds holding the Flag of Flanders were included so as to add credence to the news report. 

The broadcast of the report led to widespread alarm and consternation in French-speaking Belgium. A hotline set up by the station was swamped by 2,600 calls, whilst RTBF's website crashed. Thirty minutes into the broadcast, on demand of the media minister of the French-speaking community in Belgium, an on-screen message identified it as fiction. 

The hoax was the creation of the journalist  and had been prepared over a period of 2 years under the codename BBB for Bye-bye Belgium. Its goal was to show Belgians the intensity of the country's issue, and the real possibility of a split of Belgium. In the years coming to the hoax there was rising Flemish separatism and the Vlaams Belang party received strong support in the regional elections. The hoax almost became reality in 2007 after a major political crisis drove many to believe that the country's division was almost certain.

Prominent Belgian politicians, including Prime Minister Guy Verhofstadt, Flemish Minister-President Yves Leterme and Walloon Minister-President Elio Di Rupo, condemned the report as "irresponsible." International reaction included an angry statement by Jean-Claude Juncker, Prime Minister of Luxembourg, who said, "This is not the kind of issue you play around with."

See also
 Partition of Belgium

References

External links
BBC news report
Belgian viewers fall for TV hoax announcing breakaway state, International Herald Tribune article documenting the hoax.
RTBF's website (in French).

Journalistic hoaxes
Flanders
Hoaxes in Belgium
2006 hoaxes
2006 in Belgian television
Television controversies in Belgium
Political controversies in television